Collapse is an independent, non-affiliated journal of philosophical research and development published in the United Kingdom by Urbanomic.

History and profile
Collapse was founded in 2006 by Robin Mackay. It serves as a successor to the ***collapse journal that operated between 1995 and 1996 and was similarly edited by Robin Mackay. The magazine is based in Oxford. It features speculative work in progress by contemporary philosophers, along with contributions from artists, scientists and other writers outside of philosophy. In December 2008, as a part of BBC Today guest editor Zadie Smith's programme, the author Hari Kunzru listed Urbanomic's Collapse as an avant-garde philosophy journal in his A guide to the artistic underground.

References

External links
Philosophy: Collapse Vol IV - Autopsy of a Genre (M/C Reviews)
Robin Mackay, ed. Collapse: Philosophical research and development. Vol. 1 (Oxford: Philosophia Mathematica, vol. 15-2, 2007)

Magazines established in 2006
Philosophy magazines
Independent magazines
Visual arts magazines published in the United Kingdom
Mass media in Oxford